Presidential Culture and Arts Grand Awards (Turkish: Cumhurbaşkanlığı Kültür ve Sanat Büyük Ödülleri) are the annual awards awarded by Presidency of Turkey.

List of awards

1995-1999 
The following awards have been presented by Süleyman Demirel.

2005 
The following awards have been presented by Ahmet Necdet Sezer.

 Halil İnalcık 
 Oktay Akbal
 Ferruh Başağa
 Ara Güler
 Sevda-Cenap And Music Foundation

2008-2013 
The following awards have been presented by Abdullah Gül.

2014-2021 
The following awards have been presented by Recep Tayyip Erdoğan.

References 

Presidents of Turkey